Euchroa is a genus of beetles in the family Carabidae, containing the following species:

 Euchroa atoyac Frania & Ball, 2007
 Euchroa carbonera Frania & Ball, 2007
 Euchroa centralis (Darlington, 1939)
 Euchroa chrysophana Bates, 1891
 Euchroa citlaltepetl Frania & Ball, 2007
 Euchroa cuiyachapa Frania & Ball, 2007
 Euchroa cupripennis Chaudoir, 1874
 Euchroa dimidiata Chaudoir, 1874
 Euchroa dives Tschitscherine, 1898
 Euchroa filodecaballo Frania & Ball, 2007
 Euchroa flohri Bates, 1882
 Euchroa harrisoni Frania & Ball, 2007
 Euchroa huautla Frania & Ball, 2007
 Euchroa independencia Frania & Ball, 2007
 Euchroa ixtapa Frania & Ball, 2007
 Euchroa jalisco Frania & Ball, 2007
 Euchroa juchatengo Frania & Ball, 2007
 Euchroa lasvigas Frania & Ball, 2007
 Euchroa miahuatlan Frania & Ball, 2007
 Euchroa nitidicollis Brulle, 1834
 Euchroa nitidipennis Putzeys, 1846
 Euchroa nizavaguiti Frania & Ball, 2007
 Euchroa onkonegare Shpeley & Araujo, 1997
 Euchroa opaca (Chaudoir, 1835)
 Euchroa pedernales Frania & Ball, 2007
 Euchroa perezi (Darlington, 1939)
 Euchroa perote Frania & Ball, 2007
 Euchroa puertogallo Frania & Ball, 2007
 Euchroa sallei Chaudoir, 1874
 Euchroa santacatarina Frania & Ball, 2007
 Euchroa soladevega Frania & Ball, 2007
 Euchroa suchixtepec Frania & Ball, 2007
 Euchroa tenancingo Frania & Ball, 2007
 Euchroa teotitlan Frania & Ball, 2007
 Euchroa tiburonicus (Darlington, 1935)
 Euchroa yucuyacua Frania & Ball, 2007
 Euchroa zempoaltepetl Frania & Ball, 2007
 Euchroa zongolica Frania & Ball, 2007

References

Pterostichinae